Thomas may refer to:

People 
 List of people with given name Thomas
 Thomas (name)
 Thomas (surname)
 Saint Thomas (disambiguation)
 Thomas Aquinas (1225–1274) Italian Dominican friar, philosopher, and Doctor of the Church
 Thomas the Apostle
 Thomas (bishop of the East Angles) (fl. 640s–650s), medieval Bishop of the East Angles
 Thomas (Archdeacon of Barnstaple) (fl. 1203), Archdeacon of Barnstaple
 Thomas, Count of Perche (1195–1217), Count of Perche
 Thomas (bishop of Finland) (1248), first known Bishop of Finland
 Thomas, Earl of Mar (1330–1377), 14th-century Earl, Aberdeen, Scotland

Geography

Places in the United States 
 Thomas, Illinois
 Thomas, Indiana
 Thomas, Oklahoma
 Thomas, Oregon
 Thomas, South Dakota
 Thomas, Virginia
 Thomas, Washington
 Thomas, West Virginia
 Thomas County (disambiguation)
 Thomas Township (disambiguation)

Elsewhere
 Thomas Glacier (Greenland)

Arts, entertainment, and media
Thomas (Burton novel) 1969 novel by Hester Burton, published in the US under the title Beyond the Weir Bridge,
Thomas (2001 film) or Gli amici di Gesù - Tommaso, a 2001 Italian film
Thomas (Jarvis novel), 1995 novel in the Deptford Histories Trilogy by Robin Jarvis
 Thomas (opera), 1985 Finnish-language opera by Einojuhani Rautavaara
 Thomas & Friends, British television series
 Thomas & Friends: All Engines Go, animated television series that acts as a reboot to Thomas & Friends.
 "Thomas," a song by A Perfect Circle from their 2000 album Mer de Noms

Companies and brands 
 Thomas', a brand of English muffins and bagels in North America
 Thomas Built Buses, an American bus manufacturer
 Thomas Cook Group, a former British, global travel giant
 Thomas Motor Company, a former US manufacturer of motorcycles and automobiles
 Thomas's of York, a pub in England
 Thomas & Betts, a designer and manufacturer of connectors and components for electrical and communication markets
 Thomas-Detroit (automobile), a former U.S. automobile manufacturer

Religion 
 Gospel of Thomas, a New Testament-era apocryphon
 Infancy Gospel of Thomas, an infancy gospel
 Book of Thomas the Contender, a gnostic book discovered in the Nag Hammadi library
 Acts of Thomas, another gnostic text
 Apocalypse of Thomas, a Christian gnostic apocalypse

Other uses 
 Thomas algorithm, a numerical algorithm to solve a tridiagonal system of equations
 Thomas theorem, a theory of belief and their consequences
 THOMAS, the U.S. Library of Congress's first online database

See also
 Thomasine (disambiguation)
 Thomasson (disambiguation)
 Thomaston (disambiguation)
 Thomasville (disambiguation)
 Tom (disambiguation)
 Tomas (disambiguation)
 Tomás (disambiguation)
 Tomašević, a surname
 Tommie, a given name
 Tommy (disambiguation)
 Tuma (disambiguation)